Francis Goes to West Point is a 1952 American black-and-white comedy film from Universal-International, produced by Leonard Goldstein, directed by Arthur Lubin, and starring Donald O'Connor, Lori Nelson, Alice Kelley, and Gregg Palmer. The distinctive voice of Francis is a voice-over by actor Chill Wills.

This is third film in Universal-International's Francis the Talking Mule series.

Plot
Bumbling former World War II serviceman Peter Stirling is sent to the U. S. Army's military academy at West Point as a reward for stopping a plot to blow up his government workplace. After enrolling, he is privately tutored by his old army friend Francis, which gets him into trouble when he reveals that this tutor is one of West Point's very own mule mascots.

Cast
Donald O'Connor as Peter Stirling
Lori Nelson as Barbara Atwood
Alice Kelley as Cynthia Daniels
Gregg Palmer as William Norton (as Palmer Lee, his birthname)
William Reynolds as Wilbur Van Allen
Les Tremayne as Colonel Daniels
Otto Hulett as Coach Chadwick
David Janssen as Corporal Thomas
James Best as Corporal Ransom

Leonard Nimoy had a small, uncredited speaking role as a football player.

Production
As soon as Francis Goes to the Races was completed, Oscar Brodney was reported in April 1951 as working on a West Point film story for the next Francis feature.

Filming began in November 1951, with additional 2nd unit filming at West Point.

Video releases
The original film, Francis (1950), was released in 1978 as one of the first-ever titles in the new LaserDisc format, DiscoVision Catalog #22-003. It was then re-issued on LaserDisc in May 1994 by MCA/Universal Home Video (Catalog #: 42024) as part of an Encore Edition Double Feature with Francis Goes to the Races (1951).

The first two Francis films were released again in 2004 by Universal Pictures on Region 1 and Region 4 DVD, along with the next two in the series, as The Adventures of Francis the Talking Mule Vol. 1. Several years later, Universal released all 7 Francis films as a set on three Region 1 and Region 4 DVDs, Francis The Talking Mule: The Complete Collection.

References

External links

Review of film at Variety

1952 films
American black-and-white films
1950s fantasy comedy films
Films directed by Arthur Lubin
Films scored by Frank Skinner
Films scored by Herman Stein
Films set in the United States Military Academy
Military humor in film
Universal Pictures films
American fantasy comedy films
1952 comedy films
Films about donkeys
1950s English-language films
1950s American films
West Point